Apethymus is a genus of insect belonging to the family Tenthredinidae.

The genus was first described by Benson in 1939.

Species:
 Apethymus apicalis
 Apethymus filiformis
 Apethymus serotinus

References

Tenthredinidae
Sawfly genera